The Sanlih Drama Awards was an annual awards ceremony that celebrated the best in SETTV drama programming. The awards were created in 2011 to help promote, celebrate and award Sanlih E-Television dramas that aired in the year. The first ceremony was held on 12 December 2012 and was originally called the "Thanks Party" (三立華劇感恩派對). No nomination list was released for the 2012 awards. Winners were announced during the ceremony. The ceremony was held each year in December at SETTV headquarters in Neihu District, Taipei. The last awards ceremony was held in 2016.

Voting
In 2013 the awards became more establish with a nomination list and voting system. The awards are given based on:
30% - Weibo web voting (only registered Weibo users can vote in all categories once per day)
30% - media voting
40% - professionals voting

Categories
Originally 12 awards were presented in 2012. In 2013 a total of 12 awards were awarded, the green leaf and media award were removed. Also the China wave and best drama awards were added. In 2014 a total of 10 awards will be awarded, with the child actor and overseas award removed.

Current categories
Viewers Choice Drama Award (2013- ) - Awarded to the most popular drama of the year with the lead actor and lead actress as recipients.
Best Actor Award (2012- ) - Awarded to the most outstanding leading actor in a drama. 
Best Actress Award (2012- ) - Awarded to the most outstanding leading actress in a drama. 
Best Screen Couple Award (2012- ) - Awarded to the male and female lead with the best on screen chemistry in a drama.
China Wave Award (2012- ) - An honorary award where the recipient is chosen by Sanlih executives. Awarded to an actor (male or female) for spreading Taiwanese entertainment outside of Taiwan. In 2014, the award was made a regular category award with a nomination list where Weibo users could vote. The award was reverted to an honorary award in 2015.
Best Kiss Award (2012- ) -  Awarded to the male and female lead with the best kissing scene in a drama.
Best Crying Award (2012- ) - Awarded to an actor or actress with the best crying scenes in a drama.
Best Powerful Performance Award (2015- ) - Integration of the "Best Lady Killer Award" and "Best Foolishly Award".
Best Potential Award (2015- ) - Awarded to a semi new artiste.
Viewers Choice Drama Theme Song Award (2016- ) - Voted by viewers and awarded to the most popular drama theme song of the year.
VIDOL TV Best Drama Award (2016- ) - Awarded to the most popular drama webstream on http://vidol.tv/.

Discontinued categories
Media Choice Award (2012) - awarded to an actor or actress by media voting. 
Best Child Actor Award (2013) - awarded to a child actor in a drama.
Most Popular Overseas Award (2012-2013) - awarded to an actor (male or female) based on Weibo and media voting outside of Taiwan.
Best Lady Killer Award (2012-2014) - awarded to an actor who plays a father figure in a drama.
Best Foolishly Award (2012-2014) - awarded to an actress who plays a mother figure in a drama.
Weibo Popularity Award (2013-2014) - awarded to an actor (male or female) based on 100% voting by Weibo users.
Best Green Leaf Award (2012, 2015) - Awarded to a supporting actor or actress in a drama.
Best Selling S-Pop Magazine Award (2015) - Non-voting award, awarded to an artiste on the cover of the years best selling issue of Sanlih's self-published magazine "S-Pop".

Hosts

Awards list

2012
:The "2012 Sanlih Drama Awards" was held on 12 December 2012 and broadcast on SETTV channel. The ceremony was named the "Thanks Party". No nomination list was released. The first ceremony was not broadcast.

2013
The "2013 Sanlih Drama Awards" was held on 28 December 2013 and broadcast on SETTV channel. The ceremony was originally scheduled for 21 December 2013 but was pushed back to allow Weibo users additional voting time. "Best Child Actor Award" and "Viewers Choice Drama Award" was added to the category list. The "China Wave Award" was turned into an honorary award with no nomination list.

2014
The "2014 Sanlih Drama Awards" was originally scheduled to be held on 20 December 2014 but was later moved up to 14 December 2014 and broadcast on SETTV channel. The award ceremony was pre-recorded earlier in the afternoon to be aired on the same evening at 10:00 pm. In 2014 the "Best Child Actor Award" and "Best Overseas Award" category was removed. Also the "China Wave Award" which was an honorary award in the past was turned into a regular award with a nomination list where Weibo users had the opportunity to vote on an recipient.

2015
The "2015 Sanlih Drama Awards" was held on 12 December 2015 and broadcast on SETTV channel at 8:00 pm. A total of 11 awards was awarded. The "Best Green Leaf Award" which was last given out in 2012 was reinstated. New award categories added are "Best Powerful Performance Award", "Best Potential Award" and "Best Selling S-Pop Magazine Award". The "Best Selling S-Pop Magazine Award" was announced during the ceremony. The "China Wave Award" was reverted an honorary award where the recipient was chosen by Sanlih executive.  Categories removed from the previous year are "Best Lady Killer Award", "Best Foolishly Award" and "Weibo Popularity Award".

2016
The "2016 Sanlih Drama Awards" was held on 10 December 2016. The event was sponsored by Taiwan cosmetics company Dr.Douxi. A total of 11 awards were given out. Awards removed from the previous year were the "Best Green Leaf Award" and "Best Selling S-Pop Magazine Award". Newly added awards added were the "Viewers Choice Drama Theme Song Award" and VIDOL TV Best Drama Award.

Performances

See also

List of Asian television awards

References

External links
 SETTV Official voting page
 2014 SETTV Official voting page
 

Taiwanese film-related lists
Chinese television awards
Taiwanese television awards
History of Taiwan